The 2022–23 season is Al-Wehda's 77th year in existence and their first season back in the Pro League following their promotion from the FD League in the previous season. The club will participate in the Pro League, and the King Cup.

The season covers the period from 1 July 2022 to 30 June 2023.

Players

Squad information

Out on loan

Transfers and loans

Transfers in

Loans in

Transfers out

Loans out

Pre-season

Competitions

Overview

Goalscorers

Last Updated: 17 March 2023

Assists

Last Updated: 17 March 2023

Clean sheets

Last Updated: 21 January 2023

References

Al-Wehda Club (Mecca) seasons
Wehda